Self-Portrait is a 2019 illustrated memoir by artist Celia Paul. The book has four "positive" reviews and eight "rave" reviews according to review aggregator Book Marks.

References

2019 non-fiction books
English-language books
Jonathan Cape books
British memoirs
Books about artists